The Perils of Gwendoline in the Land of the Yik-Yak (original title Gwendoline) is a 1984 French action comedy film directed by Just Jaeckin, written by Jaeckin and John Willie and starring Tawny Kitaen and Brent Huff.  The film is loosely based on the bondage-themed comics of Willie and on the character of Sweet Gwendoline. François Schuiten worked as a graphic designer for the film.

Plot 
Captured by a trio of thieves at a Chinese port, Gwendoline (Kitaen), a courageous but naïve girl, is sold to a local casino-brothel owner, but, rescued by Willard (Huff), a mercenary adventurer, she is reunited with her maid, Beth (Zabou), after the latter's abduction by the same thieves who had earlier kidnapped Gwendoline. Hired to transport an illegal cargo, Willard reluctantly agrees to take both women with him after Beth, withholding information vital to his livelihood, promises to divulge it only if he becomes their guide. Gwendoline, who has come to China to capture the butterfly that eluded her father, who had staked his professional reputation as a scientist on obtaining the insect, offers Willard $2,000 to take her and Beth with him to the land of the Yik-Yak, in which the butterfly may be found.

After escaping from the cannibal tribe of Kiops, the trio find the butterfly, but as she is about to capture it, Beth is captured and Gwendoline and Willard must enter an all-women tribe's underground lair to rescue the maid. The tribe is the vestige of the city of Pikaho, a primary diamond mining centre, which was swallowed by a volcanic eruption in the 12th century. Afterwards, the entire male population perished due to a disease spread by the eruption, and Pikaho turned into an all-women society considered nothing more than a legend. To ensure the survival of Pikaho, its Queen (Bernadette Lafont) allows a victor among them to mate with any man who visits or is captured by the tribe. Aided by Beth and the Queen's henchman, D'Arcy (Jean Rougerie), Gwendoline, disguised as a Pikaho warrior, wins this right.

While Gwendoline and Willard make love before the Queen, D'Arcy activates the volcano and he, the Queen, and the citizens of Pikaho are killed as Gwendoline, Beth and Willard escape. In the process, Willard is able to capture the elusive butterfly.

Cast
Tawny Kitaen as Gwendoline
Zabou Breitman as Beth
Brent Huff as Willard
Bernadette Lafont as the Queen
Jean Rougerie as D'Arcy

U.S. release
Severin Films has re-released the 88-minute U.S. release of The Perils of Gwendoline in the Land of the Yik-Yak and has also released a 106-minute Gwendoline: Unrated Director's Cut based on the French release.

References

External links 
 

 
 Movie stills
The Adventures of Sweet Gwendoline edited by J.B. Rund.(second edition, revised and enlarged) New York: Bélier Press, 1999.

1984 films
BDSM in films
French adventure comedy films
French action comedy films
1980s adventure comedy films
1980s action comedy films
Sexploitation films
Films based on British comics
Films directed by Just Jaeckin
1980s French-language films
Cantonese-language films
Films set in China
Live-action films based on comics
Films shot in the Philippines
1984 comedy films
1980s French films